Ratuș is a commune in Telenești District, Moldova. It is composed of five villages: Mîndra, Ratuș, Sărătenii Noi, Zăicani and Zăicanii Noi.

References

External links 
 Video exploring Ratuș, Bald and Bankrupt

Communes of Telenești District